Benjamin Lennart Cantelon (born August 5, 1983) is a Canadian Christian musician, who primarily plays a contemporary Christian style of worship music. He has released three extended plays, Daylight Breaks Through in 2007, with Survivor Records, Introducing Ben Cantelon in 2009, with Kingsway Music, and The Ascent, Vol 1 in 2016, and two studio albums, both with Kingsway Music, Running After You in 2009, and Everything in Colour in 2012.

Early life
Benjamin Lennart Cantelon was born in Vancouver, British Columbia, on August 5, 1983, He was raised in Langley, British Columbia, where he comes from a lineage of pastors, while his father Brent is a pastor with the PAOC.

Music career
Cantelon's music career commenced in 2005, with his first release, Daylight Breaks Through, an extended play, that was released on July 31, 2007, by Survivor Records. The second extended play, Introducing Ben Cantelon, was released by Kingsway Music, on October 20, 2009. His subsequent release, a studio album, Running After You, was released on August 30, 2009, with Kingsway Music. He released, another studio album, Everything in Colour, was released on May 8, 2012, from Kingsway Music. His song, "Saviour of the World", was nominated at the Covenant Awards in 2013, for Modern Worship Song.

Personal life
He is married to Alice Cantelon (née, Buckley), and they reside in Nashville, Tennessee, United States, with their child.

Discography
Studio albums
 Running After You (August 30, 2009, Kingsway)
 Everything in Colour (May 8, 2012, Kingsway)
EPs
 Daylight Breaks Through (July 31, 2007, Survivor)
 Spinning (October 20, 2009, Kingsway)

References

External links
 Cross Rhythms profile
 New Release Today profile
 We Are Worship profile
 Worship Together profile

1983 births
Living people
Canadian Christians
Musicians from Vancouver
Musicians from London